The 2005 Budweiser UK Open was the third year of the darts tournament organised by the Professional Darts Corporation. 170 players took part in the competition, which was held at the Reebok Stadium, Bolton, between 10–12 June 2005.

Phil Taylor eventually took the trophy with a 13–7 final victory over Mark Walsh.

The tournament also featured Phil Taylor's third televised nine-dart finish in his semi-final victory over defending champion Roland Scholten.

2004/2005 UK Open Regional Finals
26 September 2004 (Welsh) Phil Taylor 2–0 Tom Wilson 
17 October 2004 (Irish) Phil Taylor beat Mark Walsh  
12 November 2004 (Scottish) Andy Smith 2–1 Gary Anderson 
19 January 2005 (North East) Steve Hine 2–0 Bob Anderson 
6 February 2005 (South West) Andy Smith 2–0 Andy Jenkins 
6 March 2005 (Southern) Denis Ovens 2–1 Mark Dudbridge 
20 March 2005 (North West) Alex Roy 2–1 Ronnie Baxter 
10 April 2005 (Midlands) Jimmy Mann 2–0 Mark Walsh

Prize money
The prize fund was £124,000.

Friday 10 June

Preliminary round, best of 7 legs

1st Round, best of 7 legs

2nd Round, best of 7 legs

Saturday 11 June

3rd Round, best of 9 legs

4th Round, best of 15 legs

Last 32 to final

Random draws were made after each round, draw bracket has been compiled retrospectively.

References

UK Open
UK Open Darts
UK Open
UK Open